The 2nd Bersaglieri Regiment is an inactive unit of the Italian Army last based in Legnano in Lombardy. The regiment is part of the army's infantry corps' Bersaglieri speciality and was last operationally assigned to the Armored Brigade "Centauro". Its only battalion was the 2nd Bersaglieri Battalion "Governolo". On 2 September 2002 the regiment was disbanded and its war flag transferred to the Shrine of the Flags in the Vittoriano in Rome.

See also 
 Bersaglieri

References

Bersaglieri Regiments of Italy